West End most commonly refers to:
 West End of London, an area of central London, England
 West End theatre, a popular term for mainstream professional theatre staged in the large theatres of London, England

West End may also refer to:

Places

Anguilla 
West End, Anguilla
West End Pond
West End (Anguilla House of Assembly Constituency)

Australia 
Fremantle West End Heritage area, a designated heritage precinct in Fremantle, Western Australia
West End, Queensland, an inner-city suburb of southern Brisbane
West End, Queensland (Townsville), an old suburb of Townsville
West End, Adelaide, a precinct between the western ends of North Terrace and Hindley Streets in Adelaide city centre, South Australia
West End, Western Australia, a western suburb of Geraldton

Bahamas 
West End, Grand Bahama

Canada 
West End, Saskatchewan, a resort village
West End, Kamloops, British Columbia
West End, Vancouver, British Columbia
West End, Winnipeg, Manitoba
West End, Halifax, Nova Scotia
The West End, New Westminster, British Columbia

Finland 
Westend, Espoo, a district near the seashore and the eastern border to Helsinki

Germany 
 Westend, Berlin, a borough of Charlottenburg in Berlin
 Westend, Frankfurt am Main, a district of Frankfurt am Main, Hesse

New Zealand 
West End, a suburb of Palmerston North
West End, a suburb of Timaru

Norway 
East End and West End of Oslo

Spain 
West End, San Antonio, Ibiza

United Kingdom

England 
 River Westend, Derbyshire
 West End, the former name of West Hampstead, London
 West End, Bedfordshire
 West End, Esher, Surrey
 West End, Hampshire
 West End, a suburb of Morecambe, Lancashire
 West End, a suburb of Oswaldtwistle, Lancashire
 West End, North Somerset, North Somerset
 West End, Sheffield
 West End, a small village near Hatfield, Hertfordshire
 West End, a small village near Hatfield, South Yorkshire
 West End, Surrey
 West End of Derby
 West End of Leicester
 West End of London
 West End (Westminster ward), a ward in the City of Westminster

Scotland 
 West End, Aberdeen, an area of Aberdeen
 West End, Dundee, an area of the city of Dundee, Scotland
 West End, Edinburgh, of Edinburgh, Scotland, forms a large part of the city centre
 West End, a district of Glasgow

Wales 
 West End (Caldicot ward), an electoral ward of Caldicot, Monmouthshire

United States 
listed by state then city

West End, Mobile, Alabama, the westernmost section of the midtown neighborhood in Mobile
West End-Cobb Town, Alabama, a census-designated place in Calhoun County
West End, Alameda, California, neighborhood of Alameda, California
West End, district in Downtown Santa Ana, California
West End, Hartford, Connecticut
 West End (Florida) 
 West End (Atlanta), Georgia, neighborhood listed on the  National Register of Historic Places, in Atlanta, Georgia
 West End (MARTA station), Atlanta, Georgia, a passenger rail station located in the West End neighborhood of Atlanta, Georgia
West End, Davenport, Iowa
West End, Lexington, Kentucky, an urban neighborhood
West End, New Orleans, Louisiana park, entertainment, residential, marina district on Lake Pontchartrain, New Orleans, Louisiana
West End, Boston, a district of Boston, Massachusetts
West End (Portland, Maine), an urban neighborhood in Portland, Maine
West End Street, a main road in the industrial neighborhood of Delray, Detroit, Michigan
West End, Jersey City
West End, Monmouth County, New Jersey, neighborhood in Long Branch
West End, Trenton, New Jersey, neighborhood
 In New York City:
 BMT West End Line of the New York City Subway, connecting to Coney Island
 West End Avenue, a major north-south road on the west side of Manhattan
 West End Bar, a bar serving Columbia University on Broadway in Morningside Heights, Manhattan, New York City
West End (New Rochelle), a neighborhood of New Rochelle, Westchester County, New York
West End Beach, a section of Jones Beach State Park, Long Island, New York
West End, New York
West End, North Carolina
West End, High Point, North Carolina
West End, Cincinnati, a neighborhood in Cincinnati, Ohio
West End (Pittsburgh), a neighborhood that was known as Temperanceville before being annexed by Pittsburgh, Pennsylvania
West End, Providence, Rhode Island, a neighborhood in the southwestern part of Providence, Rhode Island
West End, Nashville, Tennessee, an urban neighborhood where Vanderbilt University is located
West End (Houston), a neighborhood in Houston, Texas
West End Historic District, Dallas, Texas, an area of downtown Dallas
West End, Alexandria, Virginia, an area annexed by Alexandria, Virginia
West End (Richmond, Virginia), a suburban region of Richmond, Virginia
West End, Roanoke, Virginia, an area in central Roanoke, Virginia
West End, Washington, D.C., an area in Northwest Washington
West End, West Virginia

Other uses 
Eddie Gordon (born 1959), English music producer known professionally as "West End"
West End (club), a nightclub in Chicago, United States
West End Brewery (Hindley Street) (1859–1980), an Adelaide brewer in the colony of South Australia
 Its premises in Hindley Street, Adelaide, after the takeover by the South Australian Brewing Company
 Different premises in Thebarton, after the sale of the Hindley Street building in 1980, rebadged by the Lion company as West End
West End Draught, a beer brewed in South Australia
"West End Girls", a song by Pet Shop Boys from their 1985 album Please
"West End Riot", a 1999 song by The Living End from their debut self-titled album
West End Games, a publisher of wargames and role-playing games, including Paranoia and Star Wars
WestEnd City Center, a shopping centre in Budapest, Hungary
West End Records, a disco record label from New York, United States
West End Rowing Club, a rowing club based in Auckland, New Zealand
West End station (disambiguation), train stations of the name

See also 
 City West (disambiguation) 
 Westend (disambiguation)
 West Side (disambiguation)